Johann Baptist Mehler (14 June 1860 in Tirschenreuth, Oberpfalz, died 15 March 1930 in Regensburg ) was a German Catholic priest, prelate, and religious writer of the Roman Catholic Diocese of Regensburg.

Life

Bibliography

 Don Bosco's sociale Schöpfungen, seine Lehrlingsversammlungen und Erziehungshäuser; ein Beitrag zur Lösung der Lehrlingsfrage, 1893.
 Don Bosco, der große Jugenderzieher und Verehrer Mariens, 1893.
 Der heilige Wolfgang, Bischof von Regensburg; historische Festschrift zum neunhundertjährigen Gedächtnisse seines Todes, 1894.
 Lebensbeschreibung des frommen Bischofes Michael Wittmann von Regensburg, 1894.
 Die sozialdemokratische Poesie, 1894
 Das Hl. Haus zu Loretto; zur 600jährigen Jubelfeier seiner Übertragung, 1896.
 Unsere liebe Frau von Lourdes, 1897.
 Der selige Petrus Canisius, ein Apostel Deutschlands; zum 300jährigen Gedächtnisse seines Todes, 1897.
 Unsere Liebe Frau von Altötting das National-Heiligtum Bayerns, 1898.
 Das fürstliche Haus Thurn und Taxis in Regensburg; zum 150 jährigen Residenz-Jubiläum, 1899.
 Das 300jährige Jubiläum der Marianischen Congregation Altötting, 1899.
 Der Mariahilfberg bei Amberg und die oberpfälzischen Veteranen- und Krieger-Vereine, 1901.
 Unsere Liebe Frau von Tuntenhausen; illustriertes Wallfahrtsbüchlein, 1901.
 Wallfahrtsbüchlein von Unserer Lieben Frau in Weißenregen, mit einem Anhange von Gebeten und Liedern, 1901.
 Gedenkblätter aus Kötztings Vergangenheit und der Pfingstritt, 1901.
 Die Priester-Weihe in der katholischen Kirche nach dem Pontifikale Romanum, 1902.
 Die Bischofs-Weihe in der katholischen Kirche nach dem römischen Pontifikale, 1902.
 General Tilly, der Siegreiche, 1903.
 Unsre Liebe Frau vom Bogenberge, Jubiläumsbüchlein für das Jahr 1904
 Die Festfeier des 40 jährigen Priester-Jubiläums Sr. Excellenz des Hochwürdigsten Herrn Bischofes Dr. Antonius von Henle, Reichsrat der Krone Bayerns, 1914.
 Erinnerung an Joseph Leis, Grosskaufmann und Königlich Rumänischer Consul, gestorben am 7. Nov. 1915 in Regensburg, 1916.
 Maria, Landshuts Schutzfrau: Geschichte des Gnadenbildes der "Mutter mit dem geneigten Haupt" in der Ursulinenklosterkirche St. Joseph zu Landshut, 1918.
 Juliana Engelbrecht, die gottbegnadete Jungfrau von Burgweinting, eine eucharistische Passionsblume und der selige Nikolaus von der Flüe; 2 Vorbilder und Fürbitter für den christlichen Bauernstand, 1919.
 St. Wolfgangs-Büchlein zum 925 jährigen Jubiläum unseres Bistums-Patrons (994-1919) , 1919.
 Wallfahrts-Büchlein zum heil. Salvator in Bettbrunn, 1925.
 Unsere Liebe Frau von Tirschenreuth, 1928.
 Bilder aus der Kapuziner-Tätigkeit am Gnadenort Altötting, ein Stück Bayerischer und Deutscher Kirchengeschichte, 1929.

Notes

Book title translations

References
 (in German)
  (in German)
  (in German)
  Obituary of Johann Mehler, with pictures (in German)

External links
 
Works by Johann Baptist Mehler in the catalog of the German National Library; – in German.
Website for the St. John Bosco. Johann Baptist Mehler is mentioned in the subsection: "Die Wege des Ordens nach Deutschland (The ways of the Order to Germany)"; – in German.
from the "Historical Dictionary of Bavaria, on the activities of the Salesians, (see "Frühe Kontakte der Salesianer Don Boscos zum deutschen Sprachraum")]; – in German.

1860 births
1930 deaths
20th-century German Roman Catholic priests
German male writers
19th-century German Roman Catholic priests
People from Tirschenreuth (district)